Sunan Walilanang is, according to the Babad Tanah Jawi ("History of the land of Java") manuscripts, one of the Wali Sanga ("Nine Saints") to whom Indonesian legend attributes the establishment of Islam amongst the Javanese, Indonesia's largest ethnic group.

See also

Islam in Indonesia
The spread of Islam in Indonesia

References

History of Islam in Indonesia
Wali Sanga